The Church of the Redeemer is an historic Episcopal church and parsonage located at 1 Wombaugh Square in Addison, Steuben County, New York. The complex includes a Carpenter Gothic style board and batten church constructed in 1859.  It is included in the Maple Street Historic District.

It was listed on the National Register of Historic Places in 1992. The Church of the Redeemer is still an active parish in the Episcopal Diocese of Rochester. The Rev. Joshua Barrett is the current priest-in-charge.

References

Churches on the National Register of Historic Places in New York (state)
Episcopal church buildings in New York (state)
Carpenter Gothic church buildings in New York (state)
Churches completed in 1859
19th-century Episcopal church buildings
Churches in Steuben County, New York
National Register of Historic Places in Steuben County, New York